Videobombing is the phenomenon of an unexpected appearance in a video of individuals who were not intended to be there by the operators of the camera or the individuals being filmed. The act of inserting oneself into someone else's video is often done in order to play a practical joke on the cameraman or his subjects, and sometimes in a deliberate attempt to create a video that could go viral.

For example, individuals wishing to videobomb someone may insert themselves into a video of a famous celebrity being interviewed, or a live news broadcast being filmed in the streets or in another area where outsiders are present. The individual will usually attempt to amuse the home audience by performing humorous and strange actions in the background, and may even distract and annoy the news reporter. Individuals aware that a news broadcast will occur nearby them may even prepare beforehand and turn up to the live broadcast adorning a silly costume. Some individuals such as Chris Bosh and Paul Yarrow, do this repeatedly.

A related term is photobombing, which applies the concept to a still photograph instead of video footage.

1970s-1980s: John 3:16 Rainbow Man
Rollen Frederick Stewart (born February 23, 1944), also known as "Rock 'n' Rollen" and "Rainbow Man", is a pioneer of videobombing who established himself as celebrity in American sports culture by being best known for wearing a rainbow-colored afro-style wig and, later, holding up signs reading "John 3:16" at stadium sporting events around the United States and overseas in the 1970s and 1980s.

Stewart became a born-again Christian, and was determined to "get the message out" via television.  His first major appearance was at the 1977 NBA Finals; by the time of the 1979 MLB All-Star Game, broadcasters actively tried to avoid showing him. He "appeared behind NFL goal posts, near Olympic medal stands, and even at the Augusta National Golf Club." At the 1982 Indianapolis 500, he was behind the pits of race winner Gordon Johncock. Stewart would strategically position himself for key shots of plays or athletes. Stewart's fame led to a Budweiser beer commercial and a Saturday Night Live parody sketch, where he was portrayed by Christopher Walken.

Kidnapping arrest and conviction
Stewart was arrested in 1992 after a standoff in a California hotel during which he entered a vacant room with two men he was attempting to kidnap and surprised a maid who then locked herself in the bathroom. Reportedly, Stewart believed that the Rapture was due to arrive in six days. During the standoff, he threatened to shoot at airplanes taking off from nearby Los Angeles International Airport, and covered the hotel room windows with "John 3:16" placards.

Stewart is currently serving three consecutive life sentences in prison on kidnapping charges, having rejected a plea deal of 12 years in order to spread his message in open court.  After being sentenced, he began a religious tirade and had to be restrained by bailiffs. He became eligible for parole in 2002, but was denied as recently as March 2010; his next parole review will be in 2017. After this conviction, he was found guilty of four stink bomb attacks.

References

Internet memes
Video